Ellsworth Burnett Belden (May 18, 1866March 11, 1939) was an American lawyer and judge, serving as a Wisconsin Circuit Court Judge and County Judge in Racine County, Wisconsin, for nearly 50 years, from 1889 until his death in 1939.

Biography
Born in Rochester, Wisconsin, in Racine County, Ellsworth Belden was educated in the common schools of the district and graduated from the Rochester Seminary in 1883.  He was employed by his grandfather, Judge Philo Belden, in the County Court of Racine County until the fall of 1884, when he entered the University of Wisconsin Law School in Madison, Wisconsin.  At the time of his graduation, in 1886, he was the youngest person to have ever received a diploma from the school.  At age 20, however, he was still technically too young to practice law in the state of Wisconsin, thus worked for a time as an assistant to the Attorney General of Wisconsin, Leander F. Frisby.

When eligible, he was admitted to the State Bar of Wisconsin and began practicing law in Racine County.  But in April 1889, he ran for County Judge to replace his grandfather, who was retiring.  After the younger Belden won the election, Judge Philo Belden opted to resign his office early due to his deteriorating health.  The Governor appointed the younger Belden to begin his term early and he was sworn into office on September 5, 1889.  At the time of his election, at age 23, he was the youngest County Judge in the history of the state.

After two six-year terms serving as County Judge, in 1901, Judge Belden ran for the Wisconsin Circuit Court seat in the 1st circuit and was elected in the spring election.  At the time, the 1st circuit was composed of Racine, Kenosha and Walworth counties.  

Judge Belden was re-elected in this office six times, serving over 37 years.  On February 12, 1939, he was admitted to St. Mary's Hospital in Racine, suffering from heart disease and died a month later.

Personal life and family
Ellsworth Belden was a grandson of Philo Belden, who was one of the founders of the town of Rochester, Wisconsin, and served in many state and local offices in the early years of Wisconsin's statehood.  His father, Henry Ward Belden, served as an officer in the 24th Wisconsin Volunteer Infantry Regiment in the American Civil War.

Ellsworth married Hattie Marie Raymond on June 26, 1890. They had two sons.

Judge Belden was a member of the Episcopal Church, the Knights of Pythias, Rotary International, Kiwanis Club, Optimist International, Royal Arcanum, and Modern Woodmen of America, and was a 32nd Degree Mason.  For several years, he was president of the Racine YMCA, and was credited for the fundraising effort that built the YMCA building in Racine (part of Racine's Old Main Street Historic District in the National Register of Historic Places).

During World War I, Judge Belden was an active and effective campaigner for Liberty Loans, and his son, Stanley, served as an officer in the U.S. Army.

Electoral history

Racine County Judge (1889, 1895)

| colspan="6" style="text-align:center;background-color: #e9e9e9;"| General Election, April 2, 1889

Wisconsin Circuit Court (1901–1937)

| colspan="6" style="text-align:center;background-color: #e9e9e9;"| General Election, April 2, 1901

Wisconsin Supreme Court (1916)

| colspan="6" style="text-align:center;background-color: #e9e9e9;"| General Election, April 1916

References

1866 births
1939 deaths
People from Rochester, Wisconsin
Wisconsin state court judges
19th-century American politicians
20th-century American politicians